Edward D. "Stainless" Steele (August 8, 1916 - February, 1974) was an American professional baseball outfielder in the Negro leagues, and minor leagues. He played in the Negro leagues with the Birmingham Black Barons from 1942 to 1950. He played in the Pittsburgh Pirates minor league system in 1952 with the Hollywood Stars and the Denver Bears.

References

External links
 and Seamheads

1916 births
1974 deaths
Sportspeople from Selma, Alabama
Kansas City Monarchs players
Denver Bears players
Hollywood Stars players
Baseball players from Alabama
20th-century African-American sportspeople
Baseball outfielders